Sall is the surname of the Lam Toro dynasty (King of Toro) of Senegal in the 15th century.

 Moustapha Bayal Sall (born 1985), Senegalese football central defender
 Abdou Sall (born 1980), Senegalese footballer
 Khalifa Sall (born 1956), Senegalese politician
 Malick Sall (born 1956), Senegalese lawyer and politician
 Marieme Faye Sall, Senegalese engineer and public figure who has served as the First Lady of Senegal since 2012
 Ralph Sall, American record producer, music supervisor, composer, songwriter, and screenwriter

Surnames of African origin